Joseph Louis Rosefield (18 Dec 1882 - 8 Nov 1958) was a California food businessman who invented modern, nonseparating peanut butter in 1922 – 1923.  His family business, the Rosefield Packing Company, was based in Alameda.  His new production process was licensed to another company to make Peter Pan peanut butter in 1923.  Rosefield Packing later marketed Skippy peanut butter in 1932; both brands are still sold today.  It also introduced cylindrical "wide-mouth" jars for peanut butter in 1935.  Peanut butter then became a vast food industry.  Among other roles, Rosefield Packing provided emergency supplies of peanut butter to Hawaii during World War II. Rosefield's family sold Rosefield Packing and the Skippy brand to Best Foods in 1955.

Forms of peanut butter were already popular before Rosefield's innovation.  The problem was that the oil separated from the peanut grit and did not keep.  Rosefield's patented homogenization solution was to partially hydrogenate the peanut oil to make it more miscible with the peanuts. (In other words, he added vegetable shortening to his recipe.)  This also made it possible to churn the peanut butter to a creamy consistency.  His company promised a one-year shelf life for the product and claimed that it tasted better and was less sticky than previous formulas.

References 
 Peanuts: The Illustrious History of the Goober Pea, by Andrew F. Smith, 2002. Chicago: University of Illinois Press.
 History of Skippy at the Skippy peanut butter web site.

Businesspeople from California
1882 births
1958 deaths
20th-century American businesspeople